Vega flight VV16, also called SSMS PoC Flight (for Small Spacecraft Mission Service Proof of Concept Flight), was the  launch of the Vega rocket. The launch was also notable as it was the first Vega launch following the accident of the VV15 launch in July 2019 that caused the loss of FalconEye1 satellite.

Payload 
This first low Earth orbit rideshare commercial flight for 21 customers embarked a total of 65 satellites (53 satellites to be released by the launch vehicle directly plus an additional 12 that were later released by one of them) arranged in the modular SSMS dispenser.

Of the 53 satellites that were released, 7 microsatellites weigh between 15.4 kg and 150 kg (one of them contained 12 CubeSats), while the other 46 are smaller CubeSats (between 0.25U and 6U) weighing between 0.250 kg and 7 kg:

Launch campaign 
Launch campaign activities were significantly affected by the COVID-19 pandemic. To prevent the spread of the epidemic in French Guiana and protect Guiana Space Centre employees, all launch activities were suspended on 16 March 2020. Operations for VV16 and Ariane flight VA253 could not resume until 28 April 2020. VV16 activities were listed among the top priorities at the reopening of the Guiana Space Center on 11 May 2020.

It was initially scheduled to take place on 19 June 2020 at 01:51:10 UTC but got postponed due to unfavourable high-altitude winds. The launch was then postponed to take place on 27 June 2020, and later to 29 June 2020 due to the weather conditions, and had to be postponed again until 17 August 2020. Then postponed due to Ariane 5 flight VA253 launch on 15 August 2020 at 22:04 UTC.

Arianespace announced on 1 September 2020 that the mission was postponed. Typhoon Maysak is forecast to move near the South Korean island of Jeju, the site of a telemetry station needed to track the Vega rocket after it lifts off from French Guiana. The tracking station will be secured ahead of the typhoon's arrival. "A new launch date will be set based on the evolution of the tropical storm's situation over the Jeju station and its consequences", Arianespace said in a statement. The launch date was further adjusted to 2 September 2020, then on 3 September 2020 at 01:51:10 UTC.

Flight 
The flight was launched from the ELV launch pad in Kourou, Centre Spatial Guyanais.

It deployed all satellites into 2 slightly different sun-synchronous orbits: the 7 heaviest satellites were separated at an altitude of roughly 515 km (starting 40 minutes and 25 seconds until 52 minutes and 35 seconds after liftoff), before the upper stage was re-ignited to place the 46 lightest satellites at an altitude of approximately 530 km (starting 1 hour 42 minutes and 16 seconds until 1 hour 44 minutes and 56 seconds after liftoff).

See also 

 List of Vega launches

References

External links 

 Vega flight VV16 at Arianespace

Vega (rocket)
2020 in French Guiana
Rocket launches in 2020